Józef Sobota (14 March 1903 – 2 April 1979) was a Polish footballer. He played in one match for the Poland national football team in 1926.

References

External links
 

1903 births
1979 deaths
Polish footballers
Poland international footballers
Place of birth missing
Association footballers not categorized by position